Vincenzo Gualtieri is a middleweight professional boxer from Wuppertal, Germany that has been ranked as high as 3rd in the world by the International Boxing Federation (IBF).

Gualtieri is slated to fight Esquiva Falcão for the vacant IBF middleweight world title.  Originally Falcão was supposed to fight Michael Zerafa for the title vacated by Gennady Golovkin, but Zerafa opted to pursue a World Boxing Association title fight against Erislandy Lara that opened the opportunity for Gualtieri.  

Gualtieri is the IBF Intercontinental middleweight champion.  In 2020, Gualtieri won the German middlewight title.

References

External links 

Living people
German male boxers
Middleweight boxers
Sportspeople from Wuppertal